The L64 (also called the Enfield Individual Weapon) was an intermediate calibre British bullpup layout prototype assault rifle developed in the 1970s. At one time it was known as the 4.85 Individual Weapon, a reference to the calibre of the bullet it fired.

Development
The British Army had considered bullpup designs with intermediate calibre rounds in the 1950s, and officially adopted one of these as .280 British in 1951 in the EM-2 and Taden gun. However, US intransigence during NATO standardization efforts, and Winston Churchill's interest in standards above all, led to the adoption of the 7.62×51mm NATO round. This was significantly more powerful than the .280, and could not be easily adapted to the existing weapons. Instead, the British and Canadian armies adopted the L1A1 SLR, a licensed version of the FN FAL, itself originally designed for the .280.

During the 1960s the US found that, as the British had suggested, the 7.62 NATO round was far too powerful to be used in a fully automatic rifle. After considerable wrangling, the US Army eventually adopted the M16 rifle, firing the .223 Remington cartridge of much lower power than even the .280. With standardization "broken", the British Army once again started researching lighter rounds in the 1970s. These efforts suggested that a round of similar weight as the M16s, but firing a smaller diameter bullet, would offer the same recoil patterns while having much better penetration and ballistics. The result was the .190-inch (4.85 mm) round fitted in "necked down" but otherwise standard 5.56 mm cartridges from the M16.

The Royal Small Arms Factory developed a rifle to fire the new round. The new L64/65 "Individual Weapon" was outwardly similar to the earlier EM-2, but adopted a firing mechanism very similar to ArmaLite's latest AR-18 design, which was manufactured in Britain under license by the Sterling Armaments Company from 1975 to 1983. The first examples were available in 1972.

By 1976, NATO was ready to standardize on a small calibre round, and testing of the various rounds head-to-head started in 1977. As designed, the British round performed well, but NATO concluded that the Fabrique Nationale's entry based on the 5.56 mm, the "SS-109" gave the "best all-round performance" and was selected.

The L64 pattern was later developed into the SA80 family of weapons, which entered service with the UK in the 1980s.

Overview
The L64/65 is a gas operated, 4.85mm calibre bullpup assault rifle. It uses an AR18 type operation with an SVT40 type gas piston. The SUSAT sight is robust and reliable.

See also
EM-2 rifle
Sterling SAR-87
SA80
Leader Dynamics Series T2 MK5
SR 88
List of bullpup firearms
List of assault rifles

References

Bibliography

 Ian V. Hogg and John Weeks – Military Small Arms of the 20th Century  – Arms & Armour Press/Hippocrene – 1977 – 
 Falklands Aftermath: Forces '85, Marshall Cavendish (1984),

External links
Info of the .19 calibre
XL60 4.85mm series

Assault rifles of the United Kingdom
Bullpup rifles
Light machine guns
Trial and research firearms of the United Kingdom